Compression may refer to:

Physical science
Compression (physics), size reduction due to forces
Compression member, a structural element such as a column
Compressibility, susceptibility to compression
Gas compression
Compression ratio, of a combustion engine
Compression (geology)
Compression or compressive strength

Information science
Data compression, reducing the data required for information
Audio compression (data), reducing the data required for audio
Bandwidth compression
Compression artifact, defect in data due to compression
Image compression, of digital images
Video compression
One-way compression function, a cryptographic primitive
Dynamic range compression, reducing audio dynamic range

Medicine
Brain compression, a medical condition
Compression bandage
Pressing on the lower abdominal area in an intravenous pyelogram
Cold compression therapy, for minor injuries

Other
Amplifier gain compression, due to nonlinearity
Compression (dance), several techniques
Compression (functional analysis)
Compression (phonetics), running syllables together

See also

Compaction (disambiguation)
Compress
Compression garment
Compressor (disambiguation)
Decompression (disambiguation)
Expansion (disambiguation)